Arsène Auguste (3 February 1951 – 20 March 1993) was a Haitian international footballer who represented Haiti in the 1974 FIFA World Cup.

He played professional club football with Racing Club Haïtien in Haiti and New Jersey Brewers, Tampa Bay Rowdies and Fort Lauderdale Strikers in the United States.  Auguste scored the game-winning goal in the 66th minute of a 2–0 victory for Tampa Bay in the Soccer Bowl '75.

In 1978 and 1980 he was part of the losing side in the Soccer Bowl finals, once each with Tampa Bay and Fort Lauderdale. On both occasions his side fell to the New York Cosmos, by scores of 1–3 and 0–3, respectively. In 1986, he again signed with the Rowdies, then playing in the American Indoor Soccer Association.

Auguste played in 15 World Cup qualifying matches for Haiti from 1973 to 1981, the last of these being a 1–1 draw with Mexico in the 1981 CONCACAF Championship in Tegucigalpa.

He died of a heart attack on 20 March 1993 while mowing his yard in Miami, Florida.

References

External links
 Auguste NASL stats
 Tampa Bay Rowdies 1975 Triumphal Return in Tampa, TampaPix, 16 October 2013.

1951 births
1993 deaths
Sportspeople from Port-au-Prince
American Soccer League (1933–1983) players
American Indoor Soccer Association players
Expatriate soccer players in the United States
Fort Lauderdale Strikers (1977–1983) players
Haitian footballers
Haitian expatriate footballers
Haitian expatriate sportspeople in the United States
Haiti international footballers
Ligue Haïtienne players
Major Indoor Soccer League (1978–1992) players
National Professional Soccer League (1984–2001) players
New Jersey Brewers players
North American Soccer League (1968–1984) indoor players
North American Soccer League (1968–1984) players
Pittsburgh Spirit players
Tampa Bay Rowdies (1975–1993) players
1974 FIFA World Cup players
CONCACAF Championship-winning players
Association football defenders